The Episcopal Diocese of Western Kansas, created in 1971, is the diocese of the Episcopal Church in the United States of America with jurisdiction over western Kansas. It was formerly the Missionary District of Salina until 1960 and then the Missionary District of Western Kansas until 1971.  It is in Province 7. Its cathedral, Christ Episcopal Cathedral, is in Salina. The diocesan offices are located in Hutchinson.

Current bishop
Bishop Mark Cowell was consecrated as the sixth diocesan bishop of Western Kansas on 1 December 2018.

List of bishops of Western Kansas
The bishops of Western Kansas have been:

Missionary
 Sheldon M. Griswold (1903–1917)
 John C. Sage (1918–1919)
 Robert H. Mize (1921–1938)
 Shirley Hall Nichols (1943–1955)
 Arnold M. Lewis (1956–1964)
 William Davidson, last missionary bishop (1966–1971), first diocesan bishop (1971–1980)

Diocesan
 William Davidson, last missionary bishop (1966–1971), first diocesan bishop (1971–1980)
 John F. Ashby (1981–1995)
 Vernon E. Strickland (1995–2002)
 James M. Adams (2002–2010), resigned in January, 2010
 Michael Pierce Milliken (2011-2018)
 Mark Cowell (2018- )

See also

 List of Succession of Bishops for the Episcopal Church, USA

References

External links
 The Episcopal Diocese of Western Kansas website
Official Web site of the Episcopal Church

Western Kansas
Episcopal Church in Kansas
Christian organizations established in 1971
Province 7 of the Episcopal Church (United States)